Yehiel Mark Kalish was a Democratic member of the Illinois House of Representatives for the 16th district. The 16th district, located in the Chicago area, consists of the West Ridge neighborhood in the City of Chicago and parts of the nearby suburbs of Morton Grove, Niles, Lincolnwood and Skokie. He was appointed to succeed Lou Lang who resigned earlier in January. Kalish is an ordained Orthodox rabbi. He earned a Bachelor of Arts from Hebrew Theological College and a Master of Public Administration from Walden University.

He is the only rabbi to serve in the Illinois state legislature. He is a cantor for Congregation Shaarei Tzedek Mishkan Yair in Chicago. He is the brother of Dafna Michaelson Jenet, member of the Colorado House of Representative in Denver.

On December 21, 2020, it was reported by Politico that Kalish was hired as CEO of Chevra Hatzalah, the largest such hatzalah in the United States.

Electoral history

References

External links
 Representative Yehiel M. Kalish (D) at the Illinois General Assembly

21st-century American politicians
Jewish American state legislators in Illinois
Year of birth missing (living people)
Democratic Party members of the Illinois House of Representatives
Living people
Walden University (Minnesota) alumni
Politicians from Philadelphia
21st-century American Jews